Pêche Seafood Grill is a fish restaurant in New Orleans.

History 
It won the 2014 James Beard Foundation Award for Best New Restaurant and their chef Ryan Prewitt won Best Chef in the South. Prewitt is also a partner, along with fellow chefs Donald Link and Stephen Stryjewski.

See also
 List of seafood restaurants

References

External links
Official Website
INTERVIEW WITH DONALD LINK OF PÊCHE

Restaurants in New Orleans
James Beard Foundation Award winners
Seafood restaurants in Louisiana